Tatarka may refer to:
 Tatarka (musician), hip-hop artist from Tatarstan, Russia
 , a neighbourhood in Kyiv, Ukraine
 several places with the name in Russia and Belarus, see :be:Татарка and :ru:Татарка
 Tatarka (Babka), a river in Russia
 several other Russian rivers with the name, see :ru:Татарка#Реки
 286162 Tatarka, a minor planet

See also 
 Tatarca (disambiguation)
 Tatar (disambiguation)